Christopher John Harold Wagstaff (called Chris; born 25 June 1936) was Archdeacon of Gloucester from 1982 until 2000.

Wagstaff was educated at Bishop's Stortford College and St David's College, Lampeter; and ordained in 1964. After a curacy at Tokyngton he was Vicar of Coleford with Staunton from 1973 to 1983.

References

1936 births
People educated at Bishop's Stortford College
Alumni of the University of Wales, Lampeter
Archdeacons of Gloucester
Living people